This is a list of equestrian statues in Russia.

Moscow 
Monument to General Mikhail Skobelev in the Tverskaya Street by Peter Samonov, erected in 1912, unmount in 1918.
Equestrian statue of Prince Yury Dolgoruky in the Tverskaya Street, by Sergey Orlov, 1954. A celebrated example of Socialist Realism equestrian sculpture.
Equestrian statue of Field Marshal Kutuzov in the Kutuzovsky Prospekt by Nikolay Tomsky, 1973.
Equestrian statue of Marshal Georgy Zhukov at the Manege Square by Vyacheslav Klykov, 1995.
Equestrian statue of Pyotr Bagration in the Kutuzovsky Prospekt by Merab Merabishvili, 1999.
Saint George defeats the Dragon on Poklonnaya Gora by Zurab Tsereteli, 1990s.
Saint George defeats the Dragon on the top of glass cupola at the Manege Square by Zurab Tsereteli, 1995.

Alagir 

Equestrian statue of Saint George in North Ossetia, near the highway from Alagir.

Baltiysk 
Equestrian statue of Empress Elizabeth of Russia by Georgy Frangulian, 2003. Photo

Belgorod 
Equestrian statue of Sviatoslav I in the village of Kholki, close to Belgorod, by Vyacheslav Klykov, 2005.

Biysk 
Equestrian statue of Peter the Great.

Cheboksary 
Monument to Vasily Chapayev by Pavel Balandin, 1960.

Chernyakhovsk 
Monument to Barclay de Tolly.

Dmitrov 
Monument to the Saints Boris and Gleb by Alexander Rukovishnikov, 2006.

Elista 
Equestrian statue of Jangar close to the belt route. Photo

Oryol 
 at the embankment of the Oka River by Oleg Molchanov, erected on 1 October 2016. The inauguration ceremony was held on October 14, 2016. Photo

Kaliningrad 
Еquestrian monument to Frederick William III by August Kiss, erected in 1851 in Königsberg, unmount in 1950. Photo

Kolomna 
Еquestrian monument Dmitry Donskoy in front of the Kolomna Kremlin wall

Krasnodar 
Еquestrian monument to Kuban Cossacks by Alexander Apollonov, erected in 2005.

Kushchyovskaya 
Еquestrian monument to the 4th Guards Cavalry Cossack Corps, erected in 1967.

Makhachkala 
Еquestrian monument to Magomed-Ali Dakhadayev (Makhach) in front of railway station by Khaz-Bulat Askar-Sarydzha, 1971 Photo
Еquestrian monument to the Defenders of Motherland in Stepnoy settlement by Sherif Shakhmardanov, 2006 Photo

Novocherkassk 
Monument to Matvei Platov by Anatoly Sknarin, 2003. Photo

Pskov 
Monument to Saint Alexander Nevsky and Russian druzhinniks ("Battle of the Ice") on top of the Sokolikha mountain by Ivan Kozlovsky, 1993.

Pugachyov 
Equestrian of Vasily Chapayev. Photo

Rostov-on-Don 
Monument to Semyon Budyonny by Yevgeny Vuchetich, 1972.

Ryazan 

Monument to Evpaty Kolovrat.
Monument to Saint George.

Saint Petersburg 
The Bronze Horseman, as this awesome statue of Peter the Great on the Senate Square of Saint Petersburg is generally known, is the main work of Etienne Maurice Falconet, 1782.
The Monument of Peter the Great in front of St. Michael's Castle. The sculpture by Carlo Bartolomeo Rastrelli, erected in 1800.
The Monument to Peter the Great in front of Constantine Palace in Strelna. The replica of equestrian monument of Peter the Great, at Brīvības gatves in Riga, 2003. Photo
Bronze equestrian of Nicholas I in front of St Isaac's Cathedral. It is the first oldest in the world with only the two back legs of the horse have a connection with the pedestal. The monument figures prominently in several works of fiction, including Andrei Bely's modernist novel Petersburg. The sculptor was Peter Clodt von Jürgensburg, and it was erected in 1859.
Impressionist bronze equestrian of Alexander III of Russia by Paolo Troubetzkoy, formerly at Uprising Square (1909–1937), now in the courtyard of the Marble Palace (since 1994).
Modern equestrian statues of Saint Alexander Nevsky in front of Alexander Nevsky Lavra, by Valentin Kozenuyk, 2002.
Equestrian of Vasily Chapayev in front of Semyon Budyonny Military Communications University. The replica of monument in Samara, 1968.
Equestrian of Grand Duke Nicholas Nikolaevich at Manege Square by Pietro Canonica. Was erected in 1914, destroyed in 1918. Photo

Salavat 
Monument to Salawat Yulayev, sculptor Andrey Semchenko, 1988. Photo

Samara 
Equestrian of Vasily Chapayev by Matvey Manizer, 1932.

Tolyatti 
Monument to Vasili Tatishchev on the Kuybyshev Reservoir bank by Alexander Rukovishnikov, 1998.

Tver 
Equestrian of Prince Michael of Tver at the Sovietskaya Square by Andrey Kovalchuk, 2008.

Ulan-Ude 
Equestrian statue of Gesar by Alexander Mironov in the Victory avenue, 2006.

Ufa 
Monument to Salawat Yulayev on the Belaya River bank, sculptor Soslanbek Tavasiyev, 1967. Photo

Veshenskaya 
Equestrian statue of Grigory Melekhov (hero of the And Quiet Flows the Don epic), close to Kruzhilinsky khutor.
Equestrian statue of Grigory Melekhov and Aksinia Astakhova (heroes of the And Quiet Flows the Don epic), at the bank of Don.

Vladimir 
Monument to Grand Prince Vladimir and Saint Theodore I of Rostov by Sergey Isakov, 28.07.2007.

Yekaterinburg 
Equestrian statue of Marshal Georgy Zhukov by Konstantin Grunberg, 1995. Photo

Yelabuga 
Equestrian statue of Nadezhda Durova by Fyodor Lyakh, 1993.

Yoshkar-Ola 

Equestrian statues
Russia